Eric Otto Winstedt (1880, Oxford – January 29, 1955), or more commonly E. O. Winstedt, was a British Latinist and gypsiologist. He translated Latin works to English, e. g. Marcus Tullius Cicero's letters to Atticus and compiled a 'register of Gypsy names' in the 1920s. Early in his career he published several articles on Coptic texts as well as a book with text editions. His brother was Sir Richard Olaf Winstedt.

References

External links

 

1880 births
1955 deaths
British Latinists
20th-century British historians
20th-century British translators